Manuel Mauricio Woldarsky González (born 11 March 1984) is a Chilean political activist and former member of the Chilean Constitutional Convention.

Biography
During the 2020–21 period, he decided to run as candidate for the Constitutional Convention,

References

Living people
1985 births
Chilean activists
People from Santiago
21st-century Chilean politicians
Academy of Christian Humanism University alumni
Pontifical Catholic University of Chile alumni
Members of the List of the People
Members of the Chilean Constitutional Convention